Ramses Gado (born 9 May 1982), also known as The Pharaoh, is a Romanian footballer who plays as a winger for Liga IV side Foresta Tileagd. In his career Gado played for teams such as FC Bihor, Oțelul Galați or Politehnica Iași, among others.

Personal life
Gado is of gipsy origin. He is named Ramses because his grandfather was impressed by Egypt's history and insisted for him to be named after the pharaoh Ramesses.

Legal trouble
In April 2010 Gado was arrested for organizing illegal dog fights in Hungary, having spent three months in prison. In April 2018 he was arrested again for illegal dog fights, this time organized on his property from Oradea.

Honours
Bihor Oradea
Norcia Winter Cup: 2004, Runner-up 2005
Politehnica Iași
Liga II: 2011–12
Universitatea Craiova
Liga II: 2013–14
Diosig
Liga IV – Bihor County: 2016–17
Cupa României – Bihor County: 2016–17
Foresta Tileagd
Liga V – Bihor County: 2018–19

References

External links

Ramses Gado at frf-ajf.ro

1982 births
Living people
Sportspeople from Oradea
Romanian footballers
Association football midfielders
Association football utility players
Liga I players
Liga II players
FC Bihor Oradea players
ASC Oțelul Galați players
FC Internațional Curtea de Argeș players
FC Politehnica Iași (2010) players
CS Universitatea Craiova players
CS Șoimii Pâncota players